Pant Glas was a railway station opened by the LNWR in Pant Glas, Gwynedd, Wales, serving a sparsely populated rural area. Custom was never heavy, leading to goods services being withdrawn in 1952 and the station being closed in 1957, though traffic continued to pass through until the line closed on 7 December 1964 as recommended in the Beeching Report.

References

Sources

Further material

External links
 The station site on a navigable OS Map, via National Library of Scotland
 The station and line, via Rail Map Online
 The line CNV with mileages, via Railway Codes
 Images of the station, via Yahoo
 The station and line, via LNWR Society
 By DMU from Pwllheli to Amlwch, via Huntley Archives

Disused railway stations in Gwynedd
Clynnog
Railway stations in Great Britain opened in 1872
Railway stations in Great Britain closed in 1957
Former London and North Western Railway stations